The East Kimberley Football League is an Australian rules football competition based in the Kimberley region of Western Australia, with some clubs also located across the border in the Northern Territory.

The league was formed in 1970.

Clubs

Current

Former

2018 ladder

2019 ladder

References

Kimberley (Western Australia)
Australian rules football competitions in Western Australia